Bosch: Legacy is an American police procedural streaming television series developed by Michael Connelly, Tom Bernardo and Eric Overmyer. A spin-off and eighth season of the Amazon Prime Video series Bosch (2014–2021), it stars Titus Welliver as former LAPD detective Harry Bosch, with Mimi Rogers and Madison Lintz also reprising their roles. The series premiered on May 6, 2022 on Amazon Freevee with the release of four episodes, with the remaining released weekly, two episodes at a time. The series was renewed for a second season prior to its premiere.

Plot

Season 1

Hieronymus "Harry" Bosch has retired from the LAPD and works as a private investigator. Defense attorney Honey "Money" Chandler has him work on some cases for her. His daughter, Maddie, navigates her first days as a patrol officer with the LAPD, working from Hollywood Station, where her father used to be assigned. Bosch investigates businessman Carl Rogers, who previously hired a hitman to kill Chandler. Billionaire businessman Whitney Vance asks Bosch to discreetly investigate a private matter.

Season 2

Cast

Main cast
 Titus Welliver as Hieronymus "Harry" Bosch, a former LAPD detective, now retired and working as a freelance private investigator
 Mimi Rogers as Honey "Money" Chandler, a high-powered defense attorney who has a periodically adversarial relationship with Harry
 Madison Lintz as Madeline "Maddie" Bosch, a rookie Los Angeles police officer and Harry's daughter
 Stephen Chang as Maurice "Mo" Bassi, Harry's technology expert, who shares Harry's love of jazz

Recurring
 Anthony Gonzales as Officer Rico Perez, Maddie's fellow officer and love interest
 Michael Rose as Carl Rogers, a businessman responsible for the murder of a judge and Honey's shooting
 Phil Morris as John Creighton, head of Trinity Security, a security company employed by Whitney Vance
 William Devane as Whitney Vance, a billionaire engineer who hires Bosch for a personal matter
 Andrew Korba as Philip Corwin, the new CEO of Whitney Vance's company
 Kate Burton as Ida Porter, Vance's secretary
 Steven Flynn as David Sloan, Vance's valet/butler
 Denise G. Sanchez as Officer Reyna Vasquez, Maddie's training officer
 Mark Rolston as Lt I Don Thorne, watch commander on Maddie's shift at the Hollywood Station

Guest appearances are made by members of the Bosch cast, including Gregory Scott Cummins as Crate, Troy Evans as Barrel, and Jamie Hector as Jerry Edgar. Scott Klace continues in his role as Sgt. John "Mank" Mankiewicz, the desk sergeant at the Hollywood Station, now keeping an eye on Maddie. Welliver's elder son, Eamonn, portrays a younger Bosch in episode 8, "Bloodlines".

Production
After the conclusion of Bosch, producers began discussing a new series that would feature Harry after his retirement from the LAPD, as happens in the later Bosch novels. Welliver admits that it is essentially Bosch season 8, but the focus is different: Harry is no longer a cop, and the main characters are Bosch, Maddie, and Chandler.

Episodes

Season 1 (2022)

Reception
On Rotten Tomatoes, the first season has a score of 100% with an average score of 7.4/10, based on reviews from 16 critics. The website's critics consensus reads: "Television's grumpiest detective keeps his Legacy alive and well in a reboot that picks up right where the original series left off while pleasingly tweaking the formula." On Metacritic, the first season has a weighted average score of 76 out of 100 based on reviews from five critics, indicating "generally favorable reviews".

References

External links
 
 

2020s American crime drama television series
2022 American television series debuts
American detective television series
American television spin-offs
English-language television shows
Fictional portrayals of the Los Angeles Police Department
Television series by Amazon Studios
Television shows based on American novels
Television shows filmed in Los Angeles
Television shows set in Los Angeles